New Glarus may refer to:

New Glarus, Wisconsin, a village in Green County, Wisconsin
New Glarus (town), Wisconsin, a town in Green County, Wisconsin
New Glarus Brewing Company, a brewing company located in New Glarus
New Glarus Town Hall, the town hall of New Glarus, registered to the National Register of Historic Places
New Glarus Woods State Park, a Wisconsin state park in Green County, Wisconsin